Krzysztof Kasztelan (born 10 August 1961 in Łódź) is a Polish former footballer who played mainly as a forward.

Kasztelan started his career as a trainee with Unia Skierniewice. In 1983, he made his Ekstraklasa debut, playing
for ŁKS. He ended up playing three seasons for the Łódź based club, before joining Hutnik Kraków in 1986.

In 1992, he had a brief spell as a defender in South Korea, where he joined his former ŁKS teammate, Witold Bendkowski, playing for Yukong Elephants in the K-League. He finished his career in Poland at Pabianice.

His son, Adrian Kasztelan, is also a footballer.

References

External links
 
 
 

1961 births
Living people
Footballers from Łódź
Polish footballers
Polish expatriate footballers
ŁKS Łódź players
Jeju United FC players
K League 1 players
Ekstraklasa players
Expatriate footballers in South Korea
Association football forwards